Jean Jobez (born 17 April 1943) is a French cross-country skier. He competed at the 1968 Winter Olympics and the 1972 Winter Olympics.

References

External links
 

1943 births
Living people
French male cross-country skiers
Olympic cross-country skiers of France
Cross-country skiers at the 1968 Winter Olympics
Cross-country skiers at the 1972 Winter Olympics
Sportspeople from Jura (department)
20th-century French people